Elbert is an unincorporated community located in McDowell County, West Virginia, United States. Founded as a coal town, the community is now part of the City of Gary after its post office closed. Elbert was an independent community and was incorporated into Gary, West Virginia in 1971.

References

Populated places in McDowell County, West Virginia
Coal towns in West Virginia
Neighborhoods in West Virginia